Wendy Morgan is a former Deputy in the States of Guernsey, the parliament of the Bailiwick of Guernsey in the Channel Islands.

Wendy Morgan was elected in 2004 and represented the electoral district of St. Peter Port North, but failed to gain a seat in the 2008 elections.  Deputy Wendy Morgan was the Deputy Minister of Education and controversy by proposing that the current student grant system should include a student loan in funding undergraduate courses.

Her husband, Laurie Morgan, was the Chief Minister of Guernsey from 2004 until 2007 when he was forced to resign by the Fallagate scandal.

References

Living people
Year of birth missing (living people)
Members of the States of Guernsey
Guernsey women
Guernsey women in politics
21st-century British women politicians